Begin Again is the title of the third album by the Christian trio Nutshell. Its title refers to the fact that previous members Pam Thiele and Heather Barlowe had left the group, to be replaced by Annie McCaig and Mo McCafferty. As ever, the group's output was based on Paul Field's songwriting talents.

Track listing

Side one
 "Love With no Limit" (Paul Field)
 "Don't Let Me Fall" (Paul Field)
 "Caroline" (Paul Field)
 "In the Father's Hand" (Paul Field)
 "Starry Eyed and Laughing" (Paul Field)

Side two
 "First Snow" (Paul Field)
 "Take Me Down" (Paul Field)
 "Stay Close" (Paul Field)
 "The Dancer" (Paul Field)
 "Heaven in Your Heart" (Paul Field)

Personnel
Paul Field: Vocals, Guitar and Piano
Annie McCaig: Vocals
Mo McCafferty: Vocals

Production notes
Produced by Jon Miller, Rod Edwards and Roger Hand
Engineered by Roger Wake
Recorded at Redan Recorders, Queensway, London

1978 albums
Nutshell (band) albums